Namibcypris costata is an extinct species of ostracod crustaceans in the family Candonidae, possibly endemic to the southern Kaokoveld in northern Namibia.

References

Freshwater crustaceans of Africa
Candonidae
Podocopida genera
Monotypic crustacean genera
Extinct invertebrates since 1500
Extinct crustaceans
Endemic fauna of Namibia
Extinct animals of Africa
Taxonomy articles created by Polbot